The 2007–08 Kategoria e Parë was the 61st season of a second-tier association football league in Albania.

League table

Promotion playoffs

References

 Calcio Mondiale Web

Kategoria e Parë seasons
2
Alba